Hansruedi Scheller (4 April 1931 – 15 October 2007) was a Swiss rower. He competed at the 1960 Summer Olympics in Rome with the men's eight where they were eliminated in the round one repêchage. He also participated in orienteering and won seven national titles (four as an individual and three with teams).

References

1931 births
2007 deaths
Swiss male rowers
Olympic rowers of Switzerland
Rowers at the 1960 Summer Olympics
People from Zürich District
Swiss orienteers
European Rowing Championships medalists
Sportspeople from the canton of Zürich